The Story of Peter Grey was an Australian television daytime soap opera produced by the Seven Network and first broadcast in July 1962 . James Condon starred in the title role as a church minister, with other cast members including Thelma Scott, Lynne Murphy, Moya O'Sullivan.  
 
Produced at the Seven Network's ATN-7 studio's in Sydney, the series had a run of 156 fifteen-minute episodes, and was in black and white.

Plot
Peter Grey is a clergyman appointed to a new parish. He is married to neurotic Brenda. He forms a friendship with his predecessor, Rev Henry Marner and the latter's daughter Jane.

Cast

 James Condon as Peter Grey 
 Diana Perryman as Jane Marner 
 Don Crosby as a doctor
 Stewart Ginn
 Lou Vernon as Rev Henry Marner
 Lynne Murphy as Brenda Grey 
 Gordon Chater
 Walter Sullivan as Tony Beaumont 
 Thelma Scott

Production
I
n 1959, the Seven Network (ATN7) announced they would produce three new television series, two 30-minute dramas and a 15-minute "woman's program". The 15 minute show was The Story of Peter Grey produced in the same style as there  previous endeavor Autumn Affair which ended on 20 October 1959. Peter Grey was to be shown three times a week and run for 12 months

(The first of the 30-minute dramas was to be called The World of Marius Crump, the story of the devil in the disguise of a charming, whimsical character who wins or loses a soul in each episode, similar to Damn Yankees. Each episode was to be a self-contained story, but Mr Crump will be the central character every week. The series would be written by Richard Lane. It never became am on-going series. Nor did the other 30-minute drama.)

Peter Grey was shot on videotape at the Seven Network. ATN-7's studios. By 4 July 1960 the first four episodes had been taped. By August 1961 it was reportedly halfway through filming.

Broadcast

The show screened in mid-afternoon.

The Seven Network's Melbourne station HSV-7 repeated the series in 1964, accompanied by repeats of Autumn Affair.

The Seven Network, also aired the series in reruns on SAS10 in Adelaide in 1967 on Saturday evenings at 8.30pm.

Every episode of this series is held by the National Film and Sound Archive.

See also
List of television plays broadcast on ATN-7

External links

The Story of Peter Grey at the National Film and Sound Archive

Notes

Australian television soap operas
Seven Network original programming
1961 Australian television series debuts
1962 Australian television series endings
English-language television shows
Black-and-white Australian television shows